Ragland may refer to:

Location 

 Ragland, Alabama
 Ragland, West Virginia

Surname 

 Doria Ragland, mother of Meghan, Duchess of Sussex
 Hilda Pinnix-Ragland, American business executive
 Joe Ragland (born 1989), American-Liberian basketball player for Hapoel Holon of the Israeli Basketball Premier League
 Robert O. Ragland, American film score composer
 Thomas Ragland, MP
 Tom Ragland, American baseball player

See also
 Raglan (disambiguation)

Disambiguation pages with surname-holder lists